The Zawiyas in Algeria are religious buildings located in Algeria honoring the memory of patron saints and dedicated to Quranic and religious education. They are affiliated with Sufi Torouq brotherhoods under the supervision of the Ministry of Religious Affairs and Endowments in accordance with the precepts of the Algerian islamic reference.

History

The history of the zawiyas in Algeria is linked to that of the Sufi or Tourouq brotherhoods which merge with the Sufism which was their inspiration and founder.

It was with the advent of the fifteenth century that the movement to create these spiritual retreats intensified with the decline of the Muslim world in the Machrek as in the Maghreb.

The large Muslim cities lost their scientific and spiritual influence when the last Muslim dynasties lost educational and initiatory control over the mass of Muslim faithful due to the fragmentation of territories between rival emirates.

The current Algerian territory was thus torn between two Berber Muslim dynasties that were the Zianid kingdom of Tlemcen to the west and the Hafsid dynasty of Tunis to the east.

Religious education in the Maghreb was then concentrated in Fez in the Al Quaraouiyine mosque, and in the Great Mosque of Kairouan.

As for the central part bordering the two dynasties Zianide and Hafside, it saw its great intellectual centers in Cherchell and Béjaïa being reduced to their simplest formal expression.

To save Quranic teaching in this conflicting central Maghreb, which later became Algeria, the village customary authorities took charge of safeguarding the Muslim cult by erecting zawiyas in each confederation of tribes.

Scholarly students were selected at the end of the fourteenth century and the beginning of the fifteenth century, after preliminary local Quranic studies, they were then sent to the Al-Azhar mosque in Egypt, passing either through Fez or Kairouan, to perfect their skills and doctrinal training.

The return of these hundreds of Maghrebian theologians after a journey of several years of study in the Machrek, and their installation in the Eastern Zianid and Western Hafsid villages, allowed the creation of the Zawiyas which perpetuated the Muslim influence despite the civilizational decline that then fell on the south of the Mediterranean basin.

The advent of the reconquista and the massive exodus of Andalusian Moors, towards the coast and the coastal urban centers of the Maghreb, brought with them a version of Muslim mystic inherited from Ibn Arabi and Abdul Qadir Gilani which became embedded in the landscape of Maghrebian Sufism.

Quran recitation
The Quran is the main subject taught in each zawiya in Algeria where the reading of the Quran is done according to the canonical method of Warsh recitation, by way of Al-Azraq and Al-Isfahani (death 908 CE), which is assumed in this religious institution.

Before the advent of modern mechanized printing, Algerian zawiyas relied on manuscripts of the Quran for the reading and recitation of verses and suras, but the founding of the Thaalibia Publishing in 1895 for the first time made it possible to produce the Thaalibia Quran written with the Maghrebi script, and this Mus'haf was used until 1979 as the official Mus'haf of the zawiyas in particular and of the Algerians in general.

The burgeoning popularity of the Kufic script for transcribing the Arabic language into Algerian textbooks forced zawiyas and mosques to produce a printed version of the Quran in 1979 named Algeria Quran according to this Kufic script.

Teachings

Several Islamic sciences are taught in the Algerian zawiyas, as the Hadith which is taught on the basis of Al-Muwatta compiled by Imam Malik ibn Anas.

This is how the fiqh according to the Malikite Madhhab is observed in the courts of each zawiya which is based on the body of the Mukhtasar Khalil written by Khalil ibn Ishaq al-Jundi.

Another reference of the Malikite fiqh dispensed in this zawiya is the Risala fiqhiya written by Ibn Abi Zayd al-Qayrawani.

A third Malikite fiqh reference inculcated in this zawiya is Matn Ibn Ashir written by Abdul Wahid Ibn Ashir.

The Arabic language is taught on the basis of the text of the Al-Alfiyya of Ibn Malik composed by Ibn Malik.

The syntax of the Arabic language is taught on the basis of the text of the Al-Ajurrumiyya composed by Ibn Adjurrum.

The teaching of this same syntax is based on the text of Qatr al-Nada composed by Ibn Hisham al-Ansari.

Idjazates
The talibe receives in the zawiya a certificate called Idjaza at the end of each level of his teaching to certify his pedagogical success.

This Idjaza, in addition to opening the talibe the professional doors of recruitment in the sector of religious affairs as mudaris or muezzin or imam, allows him to be gratified in the Sufi Tariqa with a  level in the Silsila of the Shuyukhs.

Ceremonies
The zawiyas, as popular religious institutions, participate in social life through activities combining the spiritual with the festive.

Thus the daily and periodic collective recitation of the Quran such as the Hizb Rateb and the Salka is at the center of the activity of each zawiya.

The ceremonies linked to the Mawlid and to the memory of the ancient Sufis in the Haḍra and the Ziyarat are also part of the social activities of these Quranic schools.

Other social festivals with religious connotations see the participation of the zawiyas in their organization and joviality such as the Ashura, the Sebiba, the Tweeza, the Wezeea and the Mawsim.

Tariqas 

Each one of the Algerian Zawiyas is affiliated to a Sufi Tariqa among:`

Zawiyas 

More than 1600 Zawiyas were existing in Algeria before its independence in 1962, among them:
Zawiya Thaalibia in Algiers.
Zawiya Thaalibia in the Issers.
Zawiyet Sidi Amar Cherif in Sidi Daoud.
Zawiyet Sidi Boumerdassi in Tidjelabine.
Zawiyet Sidi Boushaki in Thenia.
 in Algiers.
 in Bounouh.
 in Algiers.
 in Algiers.
 in Algiers.
 in Oran.
Zawiyet El Hamel in El Hamel.
 in Aafir.
 in Beni Amrane.
 in Khemis El-Khechna.
 in Boudouaou.

See also

References

Islam in Algeria
Sufism in Algeria
Ash'ari
Maliki
Sufism
Zawiyas in Algeria
Warsh recitation
Buildings and structures in Algiers